Chrysoglossa is a genus of moths of the family Notodontidae. It consists of the following species:
Chrysoglossa demades  (Druce, 1885) 
Chrysoglossa fumosa  Miller, 2008
Chrysoglossa maxima  (Druce, 1897) 
Chrysoglossa mexicana  (Hering, 1925) 
Chrysoglossa norburyi  Miller, 2008
Chrysoglossa phaethon  (Schaus, 1912) 
Chrysoglossa submaxima  (Hering, 1925) 

Notodontidae